Anzac is a hamlet in northern Alberta, Canada within the Regional Municipality (RM) of Wood Buffalo.

History 

Anzac was named for the Australian and New Zealand Army Corps during World War I, when the Alberta and Great Waterways Railway was being built from Carbondale to Waterways.

Originally named after Willow Lake, the previous name of Gregoire Lake, the community were mostly non-status or non-treaty Cree whose ancestors had migrated to the Athabasca Basin area from what was to become northern Manitoba, mostly displacing the original Beaver and Chipewyan occupants of the area.

During World War II a road was built from the rail siding to service and construct a US Army base on Stoney Mountain.

The area has seen significant growth corresponding to that of Fort McMurray and the oil industry.

The hamlet was ordered to be evacuated on May 5, 2016, due to the spread of the 2016 Fort McMurray wildfire.

Demographics 

The population of Anzac according to the 2018 municipal census conducted by the Regional Municipality of Wood Buffalo is 659, an increase from its 2015 municipal census population count of 606.

See also 
List of communities in Alberta
List of designated places in Alberta
List of hamlets in Alberta

References 

1979 establishments in Alberta
Hamlets in Alberta
Designated places in Alberta
Regional Municipality of Wood Buffalo
ANZAC